Ponte San Giovanni is a frazione of the city of Perugia, Italy. It has 13,296 inhabitants and is one of the largest and most populated neighbourhoods in the capital city of Umbria. It is also the seat of the eighth ward of the city of Perugia.

The city has also its own football team, A.S.D. Pontevecchio, currently playing in the Italian Serie D (fifth tier) and is the birthplace of Italian top-flight football manager Serse Cosmi. The local citizens are called ponteggiani.

Frazioni of Perugia